Lady Jane Grey was a noblewoman and queen of England for nine days.

Jane Grey may also refer to:
Jane Grey (actress) (1883–1944), American stage and screen actress
Jane Grey (schooner), a shipwreck in March 1918
Jane Grey, owner of Violet Bank Museum in Colonial Heights, Virginia
Jane Grey, kickboxer in W.A.K.O. European Championships 1986
Jane Grey, a film character in The Working Man (1933)

See also
Jane Gray (disambiguation)
Jean Grey, a fictional superhero by Marvel Comics

Grey, Jane